Varun is an Indian actor who appears in Tamil films. He is the grandson of Isari Velan. He was introduced in Anthony's Oru Naal Iravil (2015), and has since regularly collaborated in ventures involving A. L. Vijay and Prabhu Deva.

Career
Varun first appeared as an actor by playing the lead role in Sriman's production venture Parimala Thiraiarangam in 2011, under the stage name of Vikaash. Featuring in an ensemble cast including Kishore, Vivek and Sanusha, as well as Arya in a guest appearance, the film ran into production troubles and did not have a theatrical release. Varun subsequently moved on to apprentice as an assistant director under the supervision of A. L. Vijay and worked on the production of Thalaivaa (2013). Vijay requested Varun to consider working as an actor again in his next venture as a producer, with the pair then choosing to collaborate in the thriller film Oru Naal Iravil (2015) directed by film editor Anthony. The film did not perform well commercially but won positive reviews from critics, with Sify stating Varun did his role with "consummate ease" and the critic from Behindwoods stating "Varun does a decent job as the assistant of Sathyaraj".

Varun was also recommended by Prabhu Deva to appear alongside Jayam Ravi and Arvind Swamy in the fantasy thriller Bogan, by portraying a police officer, for which he put on more weight. Varun will also be seen in a leading role in a third Deva production Sometimes as a drug addict, as well as the second lead actor in Neruppu Da with Vikram Prabhu and Vijay's Vanamagan with Ravi and Sayyeshaa.

Varun made his debut as a hero in the 2019 Tamil comedy drama movie Puppy along with Samyuktha Hegde. Varun will make his second film as the leading actor in Deva's production venture, Vinodhan co starring Vedhika and Salony Luthra, where he portrays a character with obsessive–compulsive disorder.

Filmography

Films

Television

References

Living people
Male actors in Tamil cinema
21st-century Indian male actors
Male actors from Chennai
1992 births
Bigg Boss (Tamil TV series) contestants